New Artists Alliance is an American independent film production company.  It was founded in 2007 by Gabriel Cowan and John Suits, who met at film school.  It focuses primarily on genre films.  In order keep costs down, New Artists Alliance share profits with cast and crew, and they request more recognizable actors work for scale.  In 2014, they signed a deal with XLrator Media to co-produce three pictures.

Filmography

References

External links 
 

Mass media companies established in 2007
Companies based in Los Angeles
Film production companies of the United States